The Benton County Courthouse is a courthouse in Bentonville, Arkansas, United States, the county seat of Benton County, built in 1928. It was listed on the National Register of Historic Places in 1988. The courthouse was built in the Classic Revival style by Albert O. Clark and anchors the east side of the Bentonville Town Square.

History
Architect Albert O. Clark came from St. Louis, Missouri to Rogers, Arkansas in 1904. He utilized the Classic Revival style when designing the Applegate Drugstore and Bank of Rogers Building elsewhere in the county. Clark was hired to build many buildings in Bentonville, including the Benton County Jail and the county courthouse. His building replaced an Italianate style structure that had served the county administration needs since 1874. The very first courthouse at Benton was a log building erected in 1837.

Architecture

Built in the Classic Revival (Neoclassical) style, the Benton County Courthouse features a totally symmetrical façade with a centrally located entrance. The building also exhibits keystones, a main characteristic of Classic Revival architecture. The third floor originally included a balcony; however this was later enclosed to allow for climate control. Today the enclosed third floor windows have round-topped arches, a modification that was in keeping with the Romanesque Revival building style.

See also
 
 
 List of county courthouses in Arkansas
 National Register of Historic Places listings in Benton County, Arkansas

References

County courthouses in Arkansas
Neoclassical architecture in Arkansas
Government buildings completed in 1928
Courthouses on the National Register of Historic Places in Arkansas
1928 establishments in Arkansas
National Register of Historic Places in Bentonville, Arkansas